National Route 211 is a national highway of Japan connecting Hita, Ōita and Yahata Nishi-ku, Kitakyūshū in Japan, with a total length of 76.3 km (47.41 mi).

References

National highways in Japan
Roads in Fukuoka Prefecture
Roads in Ōita Prefecture